Academia Bautista de Puerto Nuevo or ABPN is a private Baptist Academy located in Puerto Nuevo, a part of San Juan, Puerto Rico. The school currently serves 1,100 students in grades from pre-kinder to 12.  The academy is sponsored by the Primera Iglesia Bautista de Puerto Nuevo as a service to the community in general.  The academy is accredited by The General Council of Puerto Rican Education and the Middle States Association of Colleges and Schools.  The Academia Bautista de Puerto Nuevo is also affiliated with: 

Caribbean Counselor's Association
National Association of Secondary School Principals
A participating Member of  "Learn Aid"
Member of the Private School Associations of Puerto Rico 
Participating Member of "The College Board"

The Academia Bautista de Puerto Nuevo was established in 1956 offering Kindergarten through 8th grade and sometime in the late 1980s it expanded to offer a High School Program.

References

External links
Pagina principal de la Academia 
Dubina 

Education in Puerto Rico